Boris Alexander Merchán Quiroz (born ) is an Ecuadorian male artistic gymnast, representing his nation at international competitions. At the 2014 Pan American Sports Festival he became the first artistic gymnast from Ecuador to win a Pan American medal of any kind (including the Pan American Cup, the Pan American Championships and the Pan American Games).

References

1992 births
Living people
Ecuadorian male artistic gymnasts
Place of birth missing (living people)